Susana Casillas nacida en Guadalajara jalisco (4 de Mayo 1993) es una gran representante del arte mexicano. Exponiendo en los 5 continentes, recientemente galardonada como la mejor artista plástica en Reino Unido (2021), Premiada en la bienal de Italia y la cuidad de Salerno; Doctorado en Claustro Honoris Causa y premiada por ser la representante de arte nacional e internacional. Un dato curioso de este doctorado: Es la primera vez que una persona joven (28 años) recibe un doctorado en toda la historia del Claustro.

Artistic development 
Casillas started her career as a self-taught artist. Since her childhood she experimented with watercolors and acrylic painting, later she added oil painting as one of her preferred media. About the concept of her work she stated in an interview:

"In my work I try to communicate the idea of duality. I like painting faces. I sort of make two fusions of them in my portraits. They represent the mental or earthy realm, and the spiritual one, which I call 'instinct'. I think if people were able to listen to their instinct, there wouldn't be so much evil, there would be more love; it's something ever present within, like the soul and consciousness. It tells us what is good or wrong, it also tells us when we need to be alert. I've read a lot on these subjects, they have really defined me".

Exhibitions

 Finalist and selected in the Eighth Art Show Grupo Reforma, included in the official catalog distributed in Guadalajara, Mexico City, Monterrey, and Paris, France.
 ArtFest 2016 in American School
 Galería LARVA (Laboratorio de Arte Variedades)
 PALCCO Museum, where she was introduced as an emergent artist with a valuable career path, since she has been involved in the art community, collaborating and working with established artists.
 She had the honor of intervening a guitar for the great musician VCarlos Santana, delivered in Las Vegas, Nevada.
 Exhibition in Guangzhou, China, Mansión ACA
 Exhibition en Shenzhen, China, Gallery Art Museum.
 She took part as a jury member in the painting category for the Jalisco Education Secretary two years in a row.
 Exhibition “Eye of the Beholder”, Arkansas, USA. 
 Exhibition at Agave Rosa Gallery, El Paso, Texas, USA.
 Cover and content for PERSONAE magazine.
 Exhibition at Museo de Antropología e Historia (MAHO), Ocotlán, Jalisco (first woman in taking part in an exhibition).
 Mónica Saucedo Gallery, Colima.
 Exhibition “Duality/Liberty”, Santa Barbara, California.
 Intervened “pakal” for Mayan Parade.
 Intervention for dress by Rosario Mendoza “TAKASAMI”
 Fine artist at SMI
 Projects and patronage from Tequila Patrón
 Selected among the “Hundred Woman in the Visual Arts from Mexico” to take part in this exhibition in the ceremony of International Women’s Day 2018
 Exhibition at Museo Regional Del Valle del Fuerte (Los Mochis, Sinaloa) 
 “AMARTE”, project of inclusive art. CRIT, Teletón
 Exhibition at MUSA (Museo de las Artes de la Universidad de Guadalajara). 
She’s currently working on her upcoming exhibitions for the year 2018: Los Angeles, Chicago, Santa Barbara (USA), Paris (France), Mexico City, León, Guadalajara, Baja California Sur, Los Mochis, Oaxaca (Mexico), and Norway.

References

External links 
 
Profile at YoArtista
At Artamo Gallery
At Vida & Mujer Magazine
Review at GDL Fashion

Living people
Mexican artists
People from Guadalajara, Jalisco
Artists from Guadalajara, Jalisco
Year of birth missing (living people)